WYKC (99.1 FM) is a K-Love radio station owned by the Educational Media Foundation, transmitting from Whitefield, New Hampshire to the Northeast Kingdom and northern New Hampshire.

EMF acquired the station, previously known as both WXRG 99.1 shortly from 2007 to 2008 and WNYN-FM "Free 99.1" and airing an adult hits format from 2008 to 2021, from Devon Broadcasting Corporation in 2020, as part of its sale of three New Hampshire FMs to the Christian broadcaster. The call letters changed to WYKC on January 6, 2021, coincidental with the consummation of the sale.

References

External links

YKC
Educational Media Foundation radio stations
K-Love radio stations
Radio stations established in 2007
Coös County, New Hampshire